Novo is a village in Kuvshinovsky District of Tver Oblast, Russia.

References

Rural localities in Kuvshinovsky District
Novotorzhsky Uyezd